Operation Bulldog Mammoth was a brigade-sized cordon and search of an Abu Ghurayb apartment complex, northwest of Baghdad on 4 December 2003 during the American-led 2003 invasion of Iraq. The operation lasted about five-and-a-half hours and involved approximately 1,450 soldiers.

This unusual brigade-sized cordon and search was led by the US Army's 1st Armored Div., 3rd Brigade Combat Team and was supported by the US Army's 82nd Airborne Division, 325th Airborne Infantry Regiment, more than 300 Iraqi Civil Defense Corps personnel and an Estonian army platoon.

Additionally, the operation was also supported by two companies from the 709th Military Police Battalion, which provided an outer cordon, and four AH-64 Apache helicopters, which provided air support.

The cordon and search went through 2,400 apartments, 53 additional buildings and seized: more than 220 AK-47 assault rifles, along with a number of machine guns, pistols and other rifles; five rocket propelled grenades and 15 RPG sights; 10 grenades; 12 mortar sights; various electrical components associated with improvised explosive devise construction; Russian-made night vision devices; protective masks; 24 plates of body armor and a U.S.-made vest; Saddam Hussein paraphernalia; and 16 cases of U.S. military meals, ready to eat.

Additionally, the soldiers detained 40 personnel, including three on a by-name "black" list of suspects who were caught in the outer cordon while trying to escape the area.

Although intelligence reports narrowed in on the particular apartment complex as a haven for anti-coalition forces, no shots were fired during this operation. Preceded by Operation Bayonet Lightning, followed by Operation Clear Area.

References

Military operations of the Iraq War in 2003
Military operations of the Iraq War involving the United States
Military operations of the Iraq War involving Iraq